Vitan may refer to:

Vitan, a neighborhood in southeastern Bucharest, Romania
Vitan, a settlement in the Ormož Municipality in northeastern Slovenia.

ca:Vitan
es:Vitan
ro:Vitan